lzip is a free, command-line tool for the compression of data; it employs the Lempel–Ziv–Markov chain algorithm (LZMA) with a user interface that is familiar to users of usual Unix compression tools, such as gzip and bzip2.

Like gzip and bzip2, concatenation is supported to compress multiple files, but the convention is to bundle a file that is an archive itself, such as those created by the tar or cpio Unix programs. Lzip can split the output for the creation of multivolume archives.

The file that is produced by lzip is usually given .lz as its filename extension, and the data is described by the media type application/lzip.

The lzip suite of programs was written in C++ and C by Antonio Diaz Diaz and is being distributed as free software under the terms of version 2 or later of the GNU General Public License (GPL).

History
7-Zip was released in 2000; a tool employing LZMA first became available on Unix-like operating systems in 2004 when a port of the command-line version of 7-Zip (p7zip) was released. In the same year, the LZMA SDK became available, which included the program called “lzma_alone”; less than a year later, Lasse Collin released LZMA Utils, which at first only consisted of a set of wrapper scripts implementing a gzip-like interface to lzma_alone. In 2008, Antonio Diaz Diaz released lzip, which uses a container format with checksums and magic numbers instead of the raw LZMA data stream, providing a complete Unix-style solution for using LZMA. Nevertheless, LZMA Utils was extended to have similar features and then renamed to XZ Utils.

Features

File integrity
lzip is capable of creating archives with independently decompressible data sections called a "multimember archive" (as well as split output for the creation of multivolume archives). For example, if the underlying file is a tar archive, this can allow extracting any undamaged files, even if other parts of the archive are damaged.

As for the file format, special emphasis has been put on enabling integrity checks by means of an integrated 32-bit checksum for each compressed stream; this is used in combination with the lziprecover program to detect and reconstruct damaged data. This recovery tool can merge multiple copies of an archive where each copy may have damage in a different part of the file.

Parallelism
lzip has two parallel interfaces provided in the default distribution.
  compresses any file in a parallel way.
  combines  and  into a parallel archiver much like modern archivers like RAR or 7-Zip. The solid compression blocks align with  file boundaries, so extracting a file only requires decompressing that particular member block.

Adoption

Availability 
In popular Linux distributions, lzip can usually be installed from official package repositories.

Cygwin offers lzip as a maintained optional package (Archive category of its setup installer), and its GNU tar utility program has support for .lz archives (with --lzip option for creation). MinGW-w64 distributes lzip through a maintained package in MSYS2 (pacman -S lzip).

Lzip is also available for Android in a terminal-interface which was ported by Master-Console Inc.

Support 
 The GNU Autotools support lzip.  Adding dist-lzip to AM_INIT_AUTOMAKE will build lzip-ed tarballs.
 Versions 1.23 and newer of GNU tar support using lzip to handle compressed files transparently.
 GNOME's archiving tool, Archive Manager, supports lzip files.

Application 
 The Linux distribution Dragora GNU/Linux-Libre employs lzip for its software packages.
 Lzip is used to distribute the Time Zone Database from IANA, and the GNU version of the Linux kernel.
 The European Parliament publishes complete dumps of its database in JSON format compressed with lzip.
 Lzip is used in NASA's Planetary Data System (PDS).

See also

 Lossless data compression

References

External links
 
 Lzip format specification
 Lzip format specification at IETF

Free data compression software